Sami Petri Tapani Leinonen (born 30 September 1963) is a retired Finnish Nordic combined skier.

Representing the sports club Lahden Hiihtoseura, he competed in the Nordic Combined World Cup from the mid-1980s to around 1990. He finished 17th in the individual race at the 1988 Winter Olympics.

References 

1963 births
Living people
People from Lahti
Finnish male Nordic combined skiers
Nordic combined skiers at the 1988 Winter Olympics
Olympic Nordic combined skiers of Finland
20th-century Finnish people